GH3 may refer to the

 music video game Guitar Hero III: Legends of Rock
 mirrorless interchangeable lens camera Panasonic Lumix DMC-GH3